Beau Dermott (born 28 October 2003) is a British musical theatre singer. She rose to fame in 2016 during the tenth series of Britain's Got Talent.

Career
Beau Dermott auditioned for the tenth series of Britain's Got Talent, singing "Defying Gravity" from the musical Wicked. She was judge Amanda Holden's Golden Buzzer act, securing herself a place in the live rounds of the competition. Her cousin, dancer Jack Higgins, also took part in this series.

She signed with Decca Records and her first album, Brave, was released on 1 September 2017.

Beau participated in the 2019 young voices at London's O2 arena.

Personal life
Beau Dermott lives in Widnes, Cheshire. She attends The Hammond School in Chester. Beau's father died in February 2018.

Discography

References 

2003 births
Britain's Got Talent contestants
Living people
People from Widnes
21st-century British women  singers